Vilhelms is a Latvian masculine given name, cognate of the English name William. The diminutive form of Vilhelms is Vilis. 

People bearing the name Vilhelms include:

Vilhelms Bokslafs (1858–1945), Baltic German-Latvian architect
Vilhelms Knoriņš (1890–1939), Latvian Bolshevik revolutionary, Soviet politician and publicist
Vilhelms Purvītis (1872–1945), Latvian landscape painter and educator

References

Latvian masculine given names